Flavius Philippus (also spelled Filippus;  340s–350s) was an official under the Roman emperor Constantius II.

Biography 

Son of a sausage-maker, Philippus rose in social standing, becoming a notarius. In 346, he became Praetorian Prefect of the East under Emperor Constantius, allegedly because of the influence of the court eunuchs. Philippus then obtained the consulate in 348.

In 351, when Constantius was facing the rebellion of the usurper Magnentius, Philippus was sent to the rebel camp, formally to negotiate a peace, but actually to discover the military readiness of the enemy. Philippus then addressed the rebel army, accusing them of ingratitude towards the Constantinian dynasty, and proposing that Magnentius leave Italy and keep only Gaul. When Magnentius tried to take the town of Siscia, Philippus was held hostage by the usurper.

It is unknown whom he married, but his grandson, Flavius Anthemius, also became Praetorian Prefect of the East.

References

Primary sources
Libanius, Orationes, xlii, lxxii.
Zosimus, Historia Nova, ii.46.2-4.

Secondary sources
 

4th-century Romans
Imperial Roman consuls
Notaries
Praetorian prefects of the East